Lever is a 1966 minimalist sculpture by Carl Andre.

The exhibiting of Lever at Primary Structures brought recognition to Andre.
It was subsequently been displayed at Dia Beacon.

References 

Minimalism
1966 sculptures
Brick sculptures